Todd Reed may refer to:
 Todd Reed (author)
 Todd Reed (designer)
 Todd Alan Reed, American serial killer and sex offender

See also
 Todd Reid, Australian tennis player